Borzi or Borzì is a surname. Notable people with the surname include:

 Antonino Borzì (1852–1921), Italian botanist
 Phyllis Borzi, former Assistant Secretary for Employee Benefits Security of the United States Department of Labor